Elections in South Africa are held for the National Assembly, provincial legislatures and municipal councils. Elections follow a five-year cycle, with national and provincial elections held simultaneously and municipal elections held two years later. The electoral system is based on party-list proportional representation, which means that parties are represented in proportion to their electoral support. For municipal councils there is a mixed-member system in which wards elect individual councillors alongside those named from party lists.

In elections of the National Assembly, every South African citizen who is 18 or older may vote, including (since the 2014 election) those resident outside South Africa. In elections of a provincial legislature or municipal council, only those resident within the province or municipality may vote. All elections are conducted by the Electoral Commission of South Africa, which is an independent body established by the Constitution.

History

Before Union
When the British took over the Cape, first in 1795 and then more permanently in 1806, they inherited a sprawling, thinly populated pastoral settlement that depended on the labour of slaves and a rural workforce of indigenous Khoikhoi whose condition was akin to serfdom. In 1806 the entire population of the colony consisted of fewer than 80,000 people: 26,768 whites, 1,200 free blacks (manumitted slaves), 29,861 slaves and 20,426 Khoikhoi. From early on the British made a determined effort to remodel this society by introducing principles of freedom and equality before the law. In 1807 the British government ended the slave trade and, finally, in 1833 outlawed the practice of slavery throughout the Empire. 

Under pressure from the humanitarian lobby in the UK, acting in concert with a local missionary campaign, the government abolished the Khoikhoi's serf-like status by the promulgation of Ordinance 50 of 1828. According to the government's instructions, 'all Hottentots and other free persons of colour, lawfully residing within the said Colony, are and shall be, in the most full and ample manner, entitled to all and every the rights, privileges and benefits of the law, to which any other His Majesty's subjects, lawfully residing within the said Colony, are or can be entitled.' This became known as the 'Hottentots' Magna Carta'. The equality of all people – black or white – appeared to be assured. As a result, when municipal boards were set up in the colony's towns and villages from 1836, any male resident who lived in a property with a yearly rent of not less than £10 could vote for his town board. From the very beginning, therefore, people of colour were able to participate in local elections.

This principle of a non-racial franchise was to be entrenched when the Cape was granted representative government in 1853. Part of the reason, no doubt, lay in the desire to give propertied Khoikhoi a greater stake in the political system. In 1850 the Khoikhoi of the Kat River Settlement had risen in rebellion and, though the uprising was defeated, it did concentrate the minds of those colonial officials and politicians who were responsible for drawing up the constitution of 1853. As the Cape's Attorney General, William Porter, famously said: 'I would rather meet the Hottentot at the hustings voting for his representative than meet the Hottentot in the wilds with a gun on his shoulder.' In terms of the constitution of 1853, any man who owned property worth at least £25 was entitled to vote for or stand in the Cape's Parliament. By 1886 Africans made up 43 per cent of the vote in six constituencies of the Eastern Cape, and were a real political force. It was not long before white politicians began challenging the rights of Coloureds and Africans to vote. The passage of the Franchise and Ballot Act, which raised the property qualification from £25 to £75 in 1892, met with an angry response from African and Coloured voters.

These developments were not without criticism or opposition. Indeed, the abolition of slavery and the promulgation of Ordinance 50, and the accompanying extension of rights to the black population, were deeply resented by the white Dutch farmers of the Cape as undermining their way of life. Starting in 1834, thousands of these Boers set out on one of the most defining events of white South African history – the Great Trek. The Dutch who moved away from the Cape did so in the hope of leaving British control and British ways of ordering society behind them. In the interior of southern Africa they would carve out independent states for themselves, the South African (or Transvaal) Republic and the Orange Free State, whose constitutions enshrined the principle of no equality between white and black in either church or state.

After the Second Anglo-Boer War, whites made peace with each other and in October 1909 came together at the National Convention. Held in Durban it brought together politicians from the Cape, Transvaal, Natal and the Orange River Colony, as well as Rhodesia. They aimed to draw up a constitution for the Union of South Africa, uniting the British possessions. The result was the South Africa Act.

Only white men were invited to consider the future of their country; women and all other racial groups were excluded. This was in some ways anomalous. After all, qualified black men had enjoyed the vote in the Cape since the 1850s and – as long as they had sufficient property, income and education – continued to do so. By 1909 there were 14,388 Coloured and 6,633 African voters in the Cape. Between them they made up 14.8 per cent of the electorate. In Natal, too, African men had the right to vote, but it was so constrained by hurdles that it was almost theoretical. Not only did they have to prove they had property, but they also had to prove that they were 'civilised' and had been so for seven years. The Governor might then grant them the vote. As we have seen, Indians also had to overcome obstacles designed to prevent them from being enfranchised. In the Transvaal and Orange Free State only white men could vote.

The Cape argued that their non-racial franchise should be extended across the proposed Union. This was rejected by the Transvaal and Orange Free State. Finally, a compromise of sorts was arrived at, maintaining the Cape's existing voting system, without extending it to the rest of the country, but insisting that this compromise was entrenched in the constitution. Africans and Coloured people would retain most of their voting rights in the Cape rights, but would not receive them in any other part of the Union.

African and Coloured politicians came together to resist these plans, and called on a former Cape Prime Minister, William Philip Schreiner, to lead a delegation to the UK to call for the Cape franchise to be implemented in the whole of South Africa. This he did, but the delegation was unsuccessful in its appeal, despite receiving considerable support from the infant Labour Party and other liberal British organisations.

At the Union
The Union of South Africa was created on 31 May 1910 by the South Africa Act 1909, an act of the British Parliament. The House of Assembly (the lower house of the newly created Parliament of South Africa) and the provincial councils were elected by first-past-the-post voting in single-member electoral divisions. The franchise in these elections was initially the same as the franchise for the lower houses in the four colonies that had formed the Union, so there were different qualifications in different provinces.

In the Transvaal and the Orange Free State, the vote was limited by law to white men over the age of 21. In Natal the vote was limited to men over 21 who met property and literacy qualifications; in theory, this could include non-white men but in practice only very small numbers managed to qualify: in 1910 over 99% of the electorate was white. In the Cape Province the franchise was also limited to men over 21 who met property and literacy qualifications, and non-white men did qualify in significant numbers, making up approximately 15% of the electorate in 1910. The qualifications in the Cape and Natal also excluded a substantial number of poorer white men. Only white men could stand for election to the House of Assembly, even from the Cape constituencies. The franchise rights of non-white voters in the Cape (but not in Natal) were entrenched in the South Africa Act by a provision that they could only be reduced by an act of Parliament passed by a two-thirds majority of both houses of Parliament sitting in a joint session.

Enfranchisement of white women and poor whites
In 1930 the National Party government of J. B. M. Hertzog passed the Women's Enfranchisement Act, which extended the right to vote and the right to stand for election to all white women over the age of 21. In the following year the Franchise Laws Amendment Act lifted the property and literacy requirements for white male voters in the Cape and Natal, with the result that all white citizens over 21 were enfranchised. As the exclusion of women and the literacy and property qualifications continued to apply to non-white voters, these acts had the effect of diluting their electoral power by more than doubling the number of white voters.

At the next following general election in 1933, Leila Reitz was elected as the first female MP, representing Parktown for the South African Party.

Segregation of black voters
In 1936 the Hertzog government enacted the Representation of Natives Act, which removed black voters from the common voters' rolls and placed them on separate "native voters' rolls". The act was passed by the required two-thirds majority in a joint session. Black voters could no longer vote in ordinary elections for the House of Assembly or the Cape Provincial Council; instead they would separately elect three members of the assembly and two members of the council. Four senators would also be indirectly elected by chiefs, tribal councils and local councils for "native areas". The Representation of Natives Act was repealed in 1959 and consequently the seats of the "native representative members" were abolished in 1960. From this point, the only political representation of black South Africans was in the Bantustan legislatures.

Segregation of coloured voters 

After coming to power in 1948 the National Party engaged in a policy of removing coloured voters similarly to black voters. In 1951 Parliament passed the Separate Representation of Voters Act, which removed coloured voters from the common voters roll and instead allowed them to separately elect four MPs. The act was challenged on the basis that it had not been passed with a two-thirds majority in a joint sitting, as required by the South Africa Act, and in 1952 the Appellate Division of the Supreme Court declared it to be invalid.

A subsequent attempt by the government to circumvent the Supreme Court by creating a High Court of Parliament failed. In the election of 1953, coloured voters in the Cape cast their ballots in the same constituencies as white voters. In 1955 the government introduced a new act which reconstituted the Senate, providing the two-thirds majority necessary to validate the Separate Representation of Voters Act.

This separate representation of coloured voters in the House of Assembly was ended in 1970. Instead, all coloured adults were given the right to vote for the Coloured Persons' Representative Council, which had limited legislative powers and was permanently dissolved in 1980.

Republic referendum 
In 1960 a whites-only referendum was held to decide whether South Africa should become a republic. No changes were made to the franchise with the Republic's emergence in 1961. However, with the policy of establishing Bantustans, the remaining black representation in the Senate was completely removed.

Tricameral Parliament 
In 1983 a referendum on constitutional reform was held, as a result of which the Tricameral Parliament was formed, consisting of three separate houses to represent white, coloured and Indian South Africans. The existing House of Assembly was retained with its white electorate, while two new houses were created: the House of Representatives elected by coloured voters, and the House of Delegates elected by Indian voters. Many Indians and Coloureds rejected this powerless government as it was a strategy by the government to divide and rule over the nonwhite vote. Elections to these houses were conducted on the basis of first-past-the-post voting in single-member electoral divisions.

End of Apartheid 
During the negotiations to end apartheid the Interim Constitution was enacted. It introduced universal suffrage on a non-racial basis, and replaced first-past-the-post voting with party-list proportional representation. South Africans of all races took part in the first fully democratic elections in 1994. "Universal adult suffrage, a national common voters roll, regular elections and a multi-party system of democratic government" are founding principles of the 1996 Constitution of South Africa, and the right of all citizens to vote is included in the Bill of Rights.

In the post-apartheid era, the Constitutional Court has struck down two attempts by the government to deny the vote to convicted criminals in prison. The court has also ruled that South Africans living outside the country must be allowed to vote. In 2020 in the New Nation Movement case the court ruled that the pure party-list electoral system is unconstitutional because it prevents individuals from standing as candidates without joining a political party; Parliament was given two years to adopt a new electoral system.

Voting districts 

Each voter in South Africa is assigned to a voting district based on the voter's residence at the time that they registered to vote. Each voting district is uniquely associated with a single voting station. Voters who are outside their registered district on election day may vote at another polling station, but additional paperwork is required. Voting districts have no significance outside of the election process, and district boundaries are drawn for purposes of efficiently planning and administering elections.

As of 2019, there were 22,933 voting districts nationwide. The district boundaries are set by the Electoral Commission's Delimitation Directorate, and are reviewed and adjusted before each election.

List of elections

Since 1910, parliamentary general elections have been held on the following dates.
 15 September 1910
 20 October 1915
 10 March 1920
 8 February 1921
 19 June 1924
 12 June 1929
 17 May 1933
 18 May 1938
 7 July 1943
 26 May 1948
 15 April 1953
 16 April 1958
 18 October 1961
 30 March 1966
 22 April 1970
 24 April 1974
 30 November 1977
 29 April 1981
 22 and 28 August 1984 (House of Representatives and House of Delegates)
 6 May 1987 (House of Assembly)
 6 September 1989 (all three houses)
 26–29 April 1994
 2 June 1999
 14 April 2004
 22 April 2009
 7 May 2014
 8 May 2019

Last election results

2019 general election

See also 
Electoral calendar
Electoral system

References

External links 

Adam Carr's Election Archive
African Elections Database
 Democratic Development in South Africa from the Dean Peter Krogh Foreign Affairs Digital Archives

 
Events associated with apartheid